The 45th New Zealand Parliament was a term of the Parliament of New Zealand. Its composition was determined by the 1996 election, and it sat until the 1999 election.

The 45th Parliament was notable in that it was the first to be elected under the new MMP electoral system, a form of proportional representation. It was also notable for the fact that it was the first New Zealand Parliament to have an Asian person, Pansy Wong, elected to it. The difference between the 45th Parliament and its predecessor were considerable — the 44th Parliament had opened with only four seats being held by minor parties, but at the opening of the 45th Parliament, minor parties held thirty-nine seats. Because of the considerably altered balance of power in Parliament, neither of the two major parties could govern alone, and New Zealand First, the largest of the four other parties in Parliament, was put in the position of "kingmaker". In the end, New Zealand First opted for a coalition with the National Party which had governed in the previous Parliament, marking the first coalition government in New Zealand for over half a century. The Labour Party continued in Opposition.

The 45th Parliament consisted of one hundred and twenty representatives. Sixty-five of these representatives were chosen by geographical electorates, including five special Maori electorates. The remainder were elected by means of party-list proportional representation under the MMP electoral system.

Electoral boundaries for the 45th Parliament

Overview of seats
The table below shows the number of MPs in each party following the 1996 election and at dissolution:

Notes
 New Zealand First initially entered into a coalition with the National Party, which broke down in 1998. Half the party resigned and became independents, while the other half remained with the party and joined the opposition.
 A collection of small parties were founded and received representation by independent MPs who were formerly with New Zealand First and Alliance. They supported the National Party in government.
 ACT and United Future extended support to the National Party, giving the government a slim majority in parliament.
 The Green Party sat in Parliament under the banner of the Alliance Party.
The Working Government majority is calculated as all Government MPs less all other parties.

Initial composition of the 45th Parliament
45th New Zealand Parliament - MPs elected to Parliament

List MPs are ordered by allocation as determined by the Chief Electoral Office and the party lists.

By-elections during 45th Parliament
There was one by-election held during the term of the 45th Parliament.

Summary of changes during term
Jim Gerard, a National Party list MP, resigned from Parliament in April 1997 to take up a post as High Commissioner in Ottawa. He was replaced by Annabel Young, the next candidate on National's list.
Alamein Kopu, an Alliance list MP, resigned from her party in July 1997. She eventually formed her own party, Mana Wahine Te Ira Tangata.
Jim Bolger, having been replaced as Prime Minister by Jenny Shipley in 1997, left Parliament in 1998. This caused a by-election in his Taranaki-King Country seat, won by Shane Ardern of the National Party.
Neil Kirton, a New Zealand First list MP, resigned from his party in July 1998 after ongoing conflict with its leadership. Kirton opposed his party's coalition with the National Party, and believed that the National Party was too dominant in the agreement. Kirton became an independent.
After the collapse of the coalition between the National Party and New Zealand First, the junior partner, New Zealand First, splintered.  Eight MPs (Jenny Bloxham, Peter Brown, Brian Donnelly, Ron Mark, Robyn McDonald, Winston Peters, Doug Woolerton, and Tu Wyllie) remained with the party, and eight MPs (Ann Batten, Tuariki Delamere, Jack Elder, Tau Henare, Peter McCardle, Tuku Morgan, Deborah Morris, and Rana Waitai) resigned and become independents. The MPs who resigned did not remain united, and eventually split four ways.
Batten, Elder, Henare, Morgan, and Waitai established the Mauri Pacific party.
Delamere joined the Te Tawharau party.
Morris resigned from Parliament. She was replaced by Gilbert Myles, the next candidate on her former party's list. Myles remained attached to New Zealand First.
McCardle remained an independent.
Jill White, a Labour Party list MP, resigned from Parliament in 1998 to become Mayor of Palmerston North. She was replaced by Helen Duncan, the next candidate on Labour's list.
Paul East, a National Party list MP, resigned from Parliament in 1999 to take up a post as High Commissioner in London. He was replaced by Alec Neill, the next candidate on National's list.
Frank Grover, an Alliance list MP, resigned from his party on 11 June 1999. He joined the Christian Heritage Party.

See also 
 Shadow Cabinet of Helen Clark

References

New Zealand parliaments